Nevado Piquenes is a mountain in the Andes Mountains of central Chile.

See also
List of mountains in the Andes

Mountains of Chile